Ran, RaN and ran may refer to:

Arts and entertainment
 Ran (film), a 1985 film directed by Akira Kurosawa
 "Ran" (song), a 2013 Japanese song by Luna Sea
 Ran Online, a 2004 MMORPG (massively multiplayer online role playing game)
Ran, a 1903 Swedish opera on the Nordic myth by Wilhelm Peterson-Berger

People
 Ran (surname), a Chinese surname
 Ran (given name)
 Ran Bosilek, Bulgarian children's book author born Gencho Stanchev Negentsov (1886–1958)
 RaN, Nissim of Gerona (1320–1376), Rabbi Nissim ben Reuven (RaN, the Hebrew acronym of his name, ר"ן)

Fictional or mythological characters
 Rán, a goddess of the sea in Norse mythology
 Ran (Shugo Chara!), in the manga series Shugo Chara!
 Ran (Urusei Yatsura), in the manga series Urusei Yatsura
 Ran, from the sprite webcomic Bob and George
 Ran Aresu, from Inazuma Eleven
 Ran Kotobuki, in the manga series Gals!
 Ran Kuroki, a character from Kamen Rider Fourze
 Ran Mitake, from the media franchise BanG Dream!
 Ran Mori, in the manga series Detective Conan
 Ran Shibuki, in the arcade collectible card game series Aikatsu
 Ran Uzaki, a main character from the 2007 Japanese tokusatsu television series Juken Sentai Gekiranger
 Ran Yakumo, in the Touhou Project series of games
 Ran Hanamichi, a character in Delicious Party Pretty Cure

Other uses 
 Ran (star) or Epsilon Eridani, a star
 Ran (Sufism), a concept of Sufism
 Ran (protein), a small GTPase that is involved in import and export within a cell nucleus as well as mitosis
 ran, in mathematics, an abbreviation of range

See also
 RAN (disambiguation)